Philipp J. Neumann (born 1977 in Leipzig) is a German theatre and film director, author and graphic designer.

Education, theatre and film work 
According to his own internet presentation, Philipp J. Neumann joined the Leipzig  at the age of six and directed his first short films and plays at the age of 15. From 1999 onwards, he then staged operas by Gluck in particular or oratorios by Handel on stages in several countries, but also other musical pieces. In addition, since 1997 he has also worked on various film productions, as director, producer, cinematographer, film editor or screenwriter.

Stagings 
 1999: Orfeo ed Euridice, opera by Christoph Willibald Gluck, in the church ruins at Wachau near Leipzig.
 2000: Iphigénie en Tauride, opera by Christoph Willibald Gluck, ibid.
 2001: Acis and Galatea, Oratorio by George Frideric Handel, performed with the Bach Society of Columbia University in Leipzig and New York
 2003 and 2004: The Magic Word and Poor Heinrich, singspiels by Josef Gabriel Rheinberger and the opera Pimpinone by Telemann, at the Moritzbastei in Leipzig
 2005: Brundibár children's opera by Hans Krása, 2009 and 2010 guest performances under the patronage of Chancellor Angela Merkel in Germany and Israel 
 2006: Wagner:Vorspiel, music theatre within the first Richard-Wagner-Gesellschaft Leipzig
 2006: Amadeus Piano, music theatre based on his own libretto (music Stephan König) and The Man in the Moon by Cesar Bresgen in the cellar theatre of Oper Leipzig.
 2008: L'enfant et les sortilèges by Maurice Ravel and Carnival of the Animals by Camille Saint-Saëns at the Musical Comedy, Leipzig.
 2008: La rondine by Giacomo Puccini in Gera
 2012: Eloise – An opera for young people, in conjunction with the GewandhausKinderchor, Leipzig.
 2013: , in conjunction with the GewandhausKinderchor, Leipzig.
 2015: Wenn der Mond aufgeht, lernst du fliegen, works by Richard Strauss in arrangements by Timo Jouko Herrmann, collaborative project between the Gewandhausorchester and the Barbican Centre London.
 2015: The Second Hurricane, scenic project with the GewandhausKinderchor (conductor: Frank-Steffen Elster).
 2017: Von Zwergen, Riesen und Kindern, scenic project with the GewandhausKinderchor (direction: Frank-Steffen Elster)
2019: Uprising! Scenic project with the Gewandhaus Children's Choir (conductor: Frank-Steffen Elster)

 Performance 
 2005: Everest Deconstruction – die Zerstörung des weltgrößten Panoramabildes by Yadegar Asisi in Gasometer Leipzig

 Films 
 1998: Der Ton in der Mitte. Spielfilm. Regie, Buch, Schnitt, Produktion und Kamera.
 2000: Das geliebte Moll. Dokumentarfilm. Regie und Drehbuch (MDR, 3sat)
 2002: Die Apostophkiller. Short film. Regie, Kamera, Schnitt und Drehbuch
 2004: Ins Fremdland. Dokumentar film. Regie und Drehbuch
 2006: Musikschule Leipzig. Imagefilm. Regie, Produktion und Drehbuch
 2008: Berliner Salon. Short film. Regie
 2010: Atropos. Short film. Regie

 Awards 
 1999: visionale Leipzig: 1. Preis für den Spielfilm Der Ton in der Mitte 2010: euro-scene Leipzig, 1. Preis der Projektausschreibung zum 20. Jubiläum für das Stück Prophezeiung 20/11 2011: Kurzsüchtig – Das Leipziger Kurzfilmfestival: Preis der Fachjury im Bereich Fiktion für Atropos 2012: Filmfest Dresden, nationaler Wettbewerb: Goldener Reiter für den Kurzfilm Atropos''.

References

External links 
 
 
 Inszenierungen und Filme von Neumann auf crew-united

Film directors from Saxony
German theatre directors
1977 births
Living people
Film people from Leipzig